Paul George Christoph von Krause (4 April 1852 – 17 December 1923) was a German jurist and politician.

Biography
Paul von Krause was born Paul Krause in Karbowo (near Brodnica), West Prussia  (modern Poland), he was ennobled ("von Krause") in 1913.

Krause studied law at the Universities of Leipzig, Heidelberg and Berlin and passed his doctorate in 1877 at the University of Göttingen. Since 1880 he worked as a lawyer, since 1887 also as a Notary, in Königsberg and Berlin.

From 1902 to 1909 Krause was a member of the board of the German bar association and Chairman of the Berlin bar association from 1905 to 1917. He was elected as a National Liberal member of the Prussian Parliament (Abgeordnetenhaus), representing the constituency of Königsberg-Fischhausen, in 1888 and became its Vice-President in 1896.

Krause was the Chairman of the German Association of inland navigation in 1904-1906 and became Secretary of State of the Reichsjustizamt on 7 August 1917. He remained in this position throughout the German November Revolution and was replaced by Otto Landsberg on 13 February 1919.

Krause became a member of the Prussian Constitutional Assembly ("Preußische Landesversammlung") in 1919 and the Prussian Landtag in 1921, representing the Deutsche Volkspartei.

Krause died in Berlin, where a street ("Paul-Krause-Strasse") is named after him.

References 

1852 births
1923 deaths
People from the Province of Prussia
German jurists
German Empire politicians
German untitled nobility
Weimar Republic politicians
Leipzig University alumni
Heidelberg University alumni
Humboldt University of Berlin alumni
Members of the Prussian House of Representatives
National Liberal Party (Germany) politicians
German People's Party politicians
Politicians from Berlin
People from Brodnica County